Cartoon Heroes: The Best of Aqua is a greatest hits album by the Danish-Norwegian dance-pop group Aqua. It was released solely in Japan on 22 May 2002.

Album information
The set includes most of the hit singles that Aqua released, with the excised singles being "We Belong to the Sea", "Good Morning Sunshine", and the Scandinavian promotional single released with the documentary Around the World, "Didn't I".

The album also includes four songs that were not released as singles, "Back from Mars", "An Apple a Day", "Calling You" and "Halloween". There is a remix of "Cartoon Heroes" as well as two music videos.

Track listing

Chart positions

Certifications

References

2002 greatest hits albums
Aqua (band) compilation albums